Tuberculosinyl diphosphate diphosphohydrolase may refer to:

 Tuberculosinol synthase, an enzyme
 Isotuberculosinol synthase, an enzyme